"Ich bin" ("I Am") is a song recorded by German singer LaFee. It was released as the lead single of her fifth studio album, Frei, on 10 June 2011. The song was used as the opening theme of the German scripted reality series .

Background
LaFee first performed the song on 4 June 2011 at the German show The Dome, which was her first live performance since 2009.

Track listing
German CD single
"Ich bin" – 2:57
"Unschuldig" – 3:02

Promotional single
"Ich bin" – 2:57

Digital download
"Ich bin" – 2:57
"Unschuldig" – 3:02

Charts

Release history

References

2011 singles
LaFee songs
2011 songs
EMI Records singles